The Philippine Senate Committee on Public Order and Dangerous Drugs is a standing committee of the Senate of the Philippines.

It was known as the Committee on Public Order and Illegal Drugs until November 9, 2010.

Jurisdiction 
According to the Rules of the Senate, the committee handles all matters relating to:

 Peace and order
 The National Police Commission
 Philippine National Police
 The Bureau of Jail Management and Penology
 The Bureau of Fire Protection
 The Philippine Drug Enforcement Agency
 The Dangerous Drugs Board
 The Bureau of Corrections
 The Office for Transportation Security
 The Bureau of Immigration
 Private security agencies
 Use, sale, acquisition, possession, cultivation, manufacture and distribution of prohibited and regulated drugs and other similar substances as provided for under pertinent laws
 Prosecution of offenders, and rehabilitation of drug users and dependents, including the formulation of drug-related policies

Members, 18th Congress 
Based on the Rules of the Senate, the Senate Committee on Public Order and Dangerous Drugs has 9 members.

The President Pro Tempore, the Majority Floor Leader, and the Minority Floor Leader are ex officio members.

Here are the members of the committee in the 18th Congress as of September 24, 2020:

Committee secretary: Arthur Lawrence L. Acierto

See also 

 List of Philippine Senate committees

References 

Public Order
Law enforcement in the Philippines